The Ghost Breakers is a 1940 American mystery/horror comedy film directed by George Marshall and starring Bob Hope and Paulette Goddard. It was adapted by screenwriter Walter DeLeon as the third film version of the 1909 play The Ghost Breaker by Paul Dickey and Charles W. Goddard.

Along with the Abbott and Costello films Hold That Ghost and Abbott and Costello Meet Frankenstein and Hope and Goddard's own The Cat and the Canary, it is cited as a prime example of the classic Hollywood horror-comedy.

Plot

The film opens in 1940 Manhattan during a violent evening thunderstorm. From a radio network's studio, broadcaster Larry Lawrence exposes the crimes of underworld boss Frenchy Duval. In her hotel suite, while listening to Lawrence on the radio, Mary Carter is visited by Mr. Parada, a sinister Cuban solicitor. He delivers her the deed to her inheritance—a plantation and mansion in Cuba. Despite Parada's objections, Mary decides to travel there by ship to inspect the property. Not even a phone call from the mysterious Mr. Mederos can convince her to stay put. Cut to the radio station, where Larry Lawrence has finished his broadcast. He receives a phone call from Frenchy Duval, who invites Larry to his hotel. Coincidentally, Frenchy lives on the same floor in the same hotel as Mary. When Larry arrives, a bullet-ridden comedy of errors ensues. Looking for cover, Larry ducks into Mary's suite, where he takes refuge in her large open trunk. Unaware of Larry's presence, Mary locks the trunk and arranges for its transport to the harbor.

Later at the dock, Larry's valet Alex searches among the luggage bound for loading and finds Larry among them. Although not in time to prevent the trunk's transfer to the ship's hold, Alex manages to get on board in order to extricate his employer before the ship sails. During the trip, Larry and Mary strike up a flirtation. Later, they meet an acquaintance of Mary's, Geoff Montgomery, a young intellectual who regales them with tales of Caribbean superstitions, particularly voodoo, ghosts, and zombies. Upon reaching Havana, Mary, Larry, and Alex go to the small island locale of her new estate.  En route they find a shack occupied by an old woman and her catatonic son, whom they believe is a zombie. The imposing plantation manor proves to be a spooky edifice indeed. They begin to explore the long-abandoned, cobweb-ridden mansion and discover a large portrait of a woman who is nearly an exact likeness of Mary—most certainly an ancestor. Soon they are terrorized by the appearance of a ghost and the reappearance of the zombie. Are these real, or are they a ruse to frighten Mary away from her inheritance?

Cast

Bob Hope as Larry Lawrence
Paulette Goddard as Mary Carter
Richard Carlson as Geoff Montgomery
Paul Lukas as Parada
Willie Best as Alex
Pedro De Cordoba as Havez
Virginia Brissac as Mother Zombie
Noble Johnson as The Zombie
Anthony Quinn as Ramon Mederos / Francisco Mederos
Tom Dugan as Raspy Kelly
Paul Fix as Frenchy Duval
Lloyd Corrigan as Martin
Uncredited (in order of appearance)
Jack Norton as Drunk
Emmett Vogan as Announcer
Robert Elliott as Lieutenant Murray  	 
James Flavin as Hotel porter  	  
Max Wagner as Ship porter  	 
Paul Newlan as Beggar 	 	 
Blanca Vischer as Dolores from Cuba  	 
Douglas Kennedy as Intern  	 
Robert Ryan as Intern

Various versions
The Dickey and Goddard play  The Ghost Breaker was filmed twice previously by Paramount, first in 1914 by Cecil B. DeMille, with stars H. B. Warner and Rita Stanwood. It was filmed again in 1922 by director Alfred E. Green, starring Wallace Reid and Lila Lee.  Both these silent film versions are now considered to be lost films.

The film was adapted for radio on Screen Directors Playhouse on April 4, 1949. Bob Hope re-created his film role, and Shirley Mitchell starred as Mary. Hope appeared again on the program for an hour-long version on June 14, 1951.

George Marshall, director of The Ghost Breakers, remade it as Scared Stiff (1953), featuring Martin and Lewis (Dean Martin and Jerry Lewis). The remake featured cameos not only from Hope, but also from Bing Crosby. A year before Scared Stiff, Martin and Lewis appeared in the Crosby/Hope film Road to Bali. Marshall also directed the not-dissimilar Murder, He Says (1945), in which Fred MacMurray compares the situation to "that Bob Hope movie The Ghost Breakers."

Scenes from the film were used in the 1972 pilot episode of The Snoop Sisters (aka The Female Instinct).

The Ghost Breakers was one of the inspirations for the Ghostbusters series of films, whereby Dan Aykroyd wanted to combine the latest research with The Ghost Breakers style of comedy.

Reception
Reviews from critics were positive. Bosley Crowther of The New York Times wrote, "It looks as though Paramount has really discovered something: it has found the fabled formula for making an audience shriek with laughter and fright at one and (as the barkers say) the simultaneous time." Variety declared it "solid comedy entertainment that will generate plenty of laughs and roll up some hefty b.o. figures along the way." Harrison's Reports called it, "One of the finest ghost stories that have been produced for some time." "Corking comedy has laughs and thrills aplenty," Film Daily reported. John Mosher of The New Yorker wrote, "The amalgam of farce and horror is very successful."

Writing in The Zombie Movie Encyclopedia, Peter Dendle said, "This is considered to be among Bob Hope's finest pictures, and the direction is smooth and the lines delivered flawlessly, but black actor Willie Best's jokes about fried chicken are no longer funny, and smarmy Hope isn't funny to begin with."  Glenn Kay, who wrote Zombie Movies: The Ultimate Guide, called it "entertaining and hugely successful", though he said some scenes are uncomfortable due to their political incorrectness.

See also
 List of American films of 1940

References

External links

 
The Ghost Breakers at Trailers from Hell
 
 

1940 films
1940s comedy horror films
1940s comedy mystery films
American black-and-white films
American comedy horror films
American comedy mystery films
American films based on plays
American haunted house films
American zombie comedy films
Films about journalists
Films directed by George Marshall
Films scored by Ernst Toch
Films set in country houses
Films set in Cuba
Films about Voodoo
Paramount Pictures films
1940 comedy films
1940 horror films
1940s English-language films
1940s American films